Yatinder Singh is an Indian bodybuilder, entrepreneur and fitness icon. His most recent accomplishments include the silver medal in 7th World Body Building and Physique Championship 2015 and Mr. India 2016.

Early life
Yatinder was born and raised in Saharanpur town of Uttar Pradesh.

Career

Bodybuilding career
The year 2001 marked the beginning of Singh's bodybuilding career. After winning his first championship in 2002, he took part in several bodybuilding and fitness competitions in India and later internationally.

Major injury
Singh had started preparing for Mr. Asia 2005. One evening while working out, he was seriously injured due to the negligence of a helping boy. Singh's lower back vertebrae had ruptured causing nerve injuries. His right hand and leg about 30 percent paralyzed. As a result, he was bedridden for months.

Singh had to stay away from bodybuilding for the next three years. To become financially independent, he soon started working as a personal trainer in a gym in Meerut, Uttar Pradesh. In 2008, he moved to Gurgaon to pursue his career as a businessman.

Second chance in bodybuilding
By 2008, Singh's back had recovered substantially and he returned to bodybuilding. He started researching and studying techniques that would help him work out without straining himself. He completed ACE and ACSM training courses. In 2010, Singh won several championships such as Mr. UP Overall title, Mr. North India, Senior Mr. India title in 75  kg category. He was also the first runner-up in the overall Sr. Mr. India and won the title of the Best Improved Bodybuilder.

He went on to win many more national and international titles.

Contest history

References

External links
 Official website

1982 births
Living people
Indian bodybuilders